Lamayouro (also known as Lamayuru) is a village in the Leh district of Ladakh, India. The Lamayuru Monastery is located nearby. It is located in the Khalsi tehsil. The region is also referred to as ‘Moon Land’, due to its terrain's resemblance to the surface of the Moon.

Demographics 
According to the 2011 census of India, Lamayouro has 117 households. The effective literacy rate (i.e. the literacy rate of population excluding children aged 6 and below) is 71.93%.

References

Villages in Khalsi tehsil